At either posterior angle of the hard palate is the greater palatine foramen, for the transmission of the descending palatine vessels and greater palatine nerve; and running anteriorly (forward) and medially (towards the center-line) from it is a groove, for the same vessels and nerve.

Variations 

The greater palatine foramen (GPF) is related to the upper 3rd molar tooth in most of the skulls (55%), 2nd molar in (12%), between the 2nd and 3rd molar in (19%) and retromolar in (14%). The shape of the foramen is elongated antero-posteriorly; however, an unusually crescent shaped foramen is rare.

See also
 Greater palatine canal
 Lesser palatine foramina

References

External links
 
 
 

Bones of the head and neck